Luis de Unzaga y Amézaga (1717–1793), also known as Louis Unzaga y Amezéga le Conciliateur, Luigi de Unzaga Panizza and Lewis de Onzaga, was governor of Spanish Louisiana from late 1769 to mid-1777, as well as a Captain General of Venezuela from 1777 to 1782 and Cuba from 1782 to 1785.

Biography 
Unzaga was born in Málaga, Spain, the son of a well-known Basque family. He served in the Italian war of 1735 and went to Havana in 1740, where he was appointed lieutenant governor of Puerto Príncipe, Cuba (now Camagüey) and later of Santiago de Cuba. During the Seven Years' War he defended Havana against a British siege, in 1762.

Unzaga accompanied Alejandro O'Reilly to New Orleans in 1769 to put down the Rebellion of 1768 by French and German colonists objecting to the cession of Louisiana to Spain via the Treaty of Fontainebleau (1762). Following the formal establishment of the cabildo (council), Unzaga became governor on December 1, 1769. In 1775, he married Elizabeth St. Maxent, the first daughter of Gilbert Antoine de St. Maxent, the wealthiest man in Louisiana. 

In 1776, the year the Declaration of Independence was signed, George Washington wrote to his friend Colonel Joseph Reed that he had just received a very flattering letter from Luis de Unzaga y Amézaga, governor of Spanish Louisiana, who referred to Washington as General de Los Estados Unidos Americanos (General of the American United States). 

Luis de Unzaga was one of the driving forces behind the birth of the United States, for which he made use of a robust secret network of family contacts. Unzaga was informed of the arrival of British troops to America and made every effort to help George Washington.

Unzaga was noted for allowing open trade. During the summer of 1776, he secretly helped Patrick Henry and the Americans by privately delivering five tons of gunpowder from the king's stores to Captain George Gibson and Lieutenant Linn of the Virginia Council of Defense. The gunpowder was moved up the Mississippi under the protection of the flag of Spain, and was used to thwart British plans to capture Fort Pitt in Pennsylvania.

Unzaga was the first Spanish official to provide direct military aid to the Continental Army during the American Revolution. After repeated requests from New Orleans merchant Oliver Pollock, Unzaga approved the secret transfer of a load of gunpowder up the Mississippi and Ohio rivers to Fort Pitt, where it arrived in May 1777. Later, additional supplies were shipped from New Orleans to Philadelphia. Pollock provided the vessels for both shipments.

From June 17, 1777, to December 10, 1782, Unzaga served as Captain General of Venezuela. In 1783 he became governor of Cuba, where one of his first actions was ordering a halt to the unrestrained cutting of cedar trees. As Governor of Cuba and Captain General of Havana, a position he would hold until 1785, in April 1783 he received Prince William of the United Kingdom, the future King William IV, with whom he reached preliminary agreements for the Treaty of Paris (1783). Later he continued to attend to the requests for help from George Washington and Robert Morris to finally achieve the birth of the United States of America. After his retirement, he returned to his native Málaga, where he occupied as Lieutenant General the General Command of the coasts of Granada. Their residences would serve as the consular agency of the United States of America in Málaga after the port of Málaga started free trade with the United States of America.

References
 Sources: Cazorla, Frank (Coord.) co-authors Cazorla-Granados, F.J.; G.Baena, Rosa; Polo, J.David: The Governor Luis de Unzaga (1717-1793) Pioneer involved in the birth of the United States of America and of Liberalism. Malaga Foundation, Malaga 2020. 

Spanish colonial governors and administrators
Governors of Spanish Louisiana
Spanish colonial period of Cuba
Colonial United States (Spanish)
People from Málaga
Politicians from New Orleans
1721 births
1790 deaths
Spanish West Indies
18th-century Cuban people
18th-century Venezuelan people